Ust-Tiskos is a rural locality (a settlement) in Gornozavodsky District, Perm Krai, Russia. The population was 13 as of 2010.

References 

Rural localities in Gornozavodsky District